Wagener Stadium is a multi-purpose stadium in Amstelveen, Netherlands.  It is currently used mostly for field hockey matches and hosted matches for the 1973 World Hockey Cup.  The stadium holds 7,600 people.

The complex has belonged to the Dutch Hockey Association ("Koninklijke Nederlandse Hockey Bond") since 1980.

Its location is the Amsterdamse Bos in Amstelveen. It was built by the Amsterdam Hockey & Bandy Club to honour its president,  (1881–1945). The building was completed in 1938, one year before World War II came to Netherlands.

During the 1970s it became clear that AHBC could no longer afford the stadium, which was eventually sold to the Koninklijke Nederlandse Hockey Bond. AHBC still has the first right to play in the stadium.

In the past, the stadium has hosted the following major tournaments:
 Hockey World Cup in 1973, 2022
 EuroHockey Nations Championship in 1983, 2009, 2017
 Champions Trophy in 1982, 1987, 2000, 2001, 2003, 2006 and 2011

References

Amsterdamsche Hockey & Bandy Club
Field hockey venues in the Netherlands
Sports venues in Amstelveen